George Thomas Crompton (8 December 1913 – 18 July 1971) was a Canadian cyclist. He competed in the three events at the 1936 Summer Olympics. Crompton died at his home in Toronto in 1971.

References

External links
 

1913 births
1971 deaths
Canadian male cyclists
Olympic cyclists of Canada
Cyclists at the 1936 Summer Olympics
Place of birth missing